Yevhen Serhiyovych Shakhov (born 6 August 1962, in Zaporizhia) is a Ukrainian professional football coach and a former player. As of 2009, he works as an assistant coach with Dnipro Dnipropetrovsk.

His son Yevhen Yevhenovych Shakhov is a professional footballer.

Honours
 Soviet Top League champion: 1988.
 Soviet Top League runner-up: 1987, 1989.
 Soviet Top League top scorer: 1988 (16 goals).
 Soviet Cup winner: 1989.
 USSR Super Cup winner: 1989.
 USSR Federation Cup winner: 1989.
 USSR Federation Cup finalist: 1990.

European club competitions
With FC Dnipro Dnipropetrovsk.

 1988–89 UEFA Cup: 2 games.
 1989–90 European Cup: 3 games.
 1990–91 UEFA Cup: 2 games, 1 goal.

External links

1962 births
Living people
Footballers from Zaporizhzhia
Soviet footballers
Association football forwards
Ukrainian footballers
FC Metalurh Zaporizhzhia players
SC Odesa players
FC Dnipro players
1. FC Kaiserslautern players
Maccabi Petah Tikva F.C. players
Maccabi Jaffa F.C. players
Maccabi Netanya F.C. players
Soviet Top League players
Bundesliga players
Ukrainian football managers
Soviet expatriate footballers
Ukrainian expatriate footballers
Soviet expatriate sportspeople in Germany
Expatriate footballers in Germany
Ukrainian expatriate sportspeople in Israel
Expatriate footballers in Israel